Kessi Isac dos Santos (born 26 October 1994), commonly known as Kessi, is a Brazilian professional footballer who currently plays as a midfielder for Hong Kong Premier League club Southern.

Club career
On 3 August 2022, Kessi joined Southern.

Career statistics

Club

Notes

References

External links

1994 births
Living people
Brazilian footballers
Brazilian expatriate footballers
Association football forwards
Agremiação Sportiva Arapiraquense players
Esporte Clube Vitória players
Lagarto Futebol Clube players
Rio Branco Sport Club players
Campeonato Brasileiro Série B players
Campeonato Brasileiro Série C players
Hong Kong Premier League players
Yuen Long FC players
TSW Pegasus FC players
Southern District FC players
Brazilian expatriate sportspeople in Hong Kong
Expatriate footballers in Hong Kong